The African Karate Federation ( (UFAK)) is the continental governing body of the sport karate in Africa.

The UFAK is a non-governmental continental organisation. It has legal personality and financial autonomy. It is non-political, non-profit, non-denominational and cannot accept any racial or other discrimination and performs its activities on an amateur basis in compliance with the principles set forth in the Olympic Charter, duly recognised by the World Karate Federation (WKF),  Association of African Sports Confederations (AASC),  Association of National Olympic Committees of Africa (ANOCA).

History

The African Karate Federation was created on June 30, 1987, in Dakar, Senegal. This continental institution is the result of the different African sport unions of karate created previously: African Union of Karate (UAK: 1978), the Confederation of African Karate Amateur (CAKA: 1980), the Union of Karate-Do Federations of Central Africa (UFKAC: 1980), the Arab Union of Karate (UAK: 1980).

The UFAK organises the African Championships, the Junior and Senior UFAK Championships in every years,  and participates in WKF World Karate Championships. The current president of the African Karate Federation is Mohamed Mesabahi Tahar from Algeria.

Members 
The African Karate Federation has 50 national federation members:

References

External links

Karate organizations
Sports organizations established in 1987
1987 establishments in Africa
Karate Federation